Petra Slováková (born 1979) is a Czech female canoeist who won four medals at individual senior level at the Wildwater Canoeing World Championships and European Wildwater Championships.

References

1979 births
Living people
Czech female canoeists
Place of birth missing (living people)